The 2008–09 season was AS Monaco FC's 52nd season in Ligue 1. They finished eleventh in Ligue 1, and were knocked out of the Coupe de la Ligue by Grenoble Foot, in the Quarterfinal, and the Coupe de France by Paris Saint-Germain at the Third Round stage.

Squad

Out on loan

Transfers

Summer

In:

Out:

Winter

In:

Out:

Competitions

Ligue 1

League table

Results summary

Results by round

Results

Coupe de la Ligue

Coupe de France

Statistics

Appearances and Goals
 

|-
|colspan="14"|Players away from the club on loan:

|-
|colspan="14"|Players who appeared for Monaco no longer at the club:

|}

Goal scorers

Disciplinary Record

References

Monaco
AS Monaco FC seasons
AS Monaco
AS Monaco